John Nelson Hyde (November 9, 1865 – February 17, 1912), known as John Hyde, was an American missionary who preached in the Punjab.

Biography
Born in Illinois, the son of a Presbyterian minister, this minister prayed that God would raise up more missionaries. John Hyde passed college and became a member of the faculty. Strangely, he resigned and entered into McCormick Theological Seminary. His elder brother Edmund was also in the seminary. Edmund dreamed of being a preacher, so in pursuit of that dream he went to preach in Montana but suddenly died of a fever. John wondered if he would take his brother's place. In his senior year, he asked a fellow student, Mr. Konkle, for his argument supporting missionary work. That night he decided to become a missionary at last.

He came to believe that God was calling him to India. He departed to India in 1892 to preach in the Punjab region. On the way, he read a letter from a friend who said he would ask God to fill John with the Holy Spirit. Angry at the suggestion that he did not already have the Spirit, he threw it away. However he then humbled himself and prayed to God for help.

As he was partially deaf, he struggled to learn the native languages. Also while in India, he continued to focus his study mostly on Scripture. His mission at first gained few converts and endured persecution, so he began to pray very intensely. From 1899 he began to spend entire nights in prayer to God. In 1904, he began to attend a conference at Sialkot. He formed the Punjab Prayer Union, the members of which set aside half an hour a day to pray for spiritual revival. In 1908 he told the conference his dream that there would be one conversion a day, and a year later over 400 more converts had been made. He came to be called "Praying Hyde" for his passionate prayers to reach lost souls.

In April 1911 he joined evangelist J. Wilbur Chapman in an evangelistic visit to three towns in England, including Shrewsbury, Shropshire. Immediately afterwards he stayed with friends in Wales, where he fell ill. He had been praying intensely when in Shrewsbury, explaining "The burden of Shrewsbury was very heavy, but my Saviour's burden took him down to the grave". His heart had moved from its normal position (in the left) to the right. Though it's more likely he had Dextrocardia, a congenital condition where one is born with their heart in a right-hand position rather than the left. He went home to Northampton, Massachusetts where a malignant brain tumour was discovered, and he died there after an operation, in February 1912, aged 46. His last words were "Shout the victory of Jesus Christ!" He was buried in his family's plot in Moss Ridge Cemetery in Carthage, Illinois.

Through his missionary work in Sialkot, Pakistan, millions of people accepted Jesus Christ, from the seeds of the Gospel which he planted.

References

 Carré, E. G. (1987), Praying Hyde: Apostle of Prayer,  Bridge-Logos Publishers. .

External links
A brief biography at CBN
Biography at higherpraise.com

American evangelicals
Presbyterian missionaries in India
American Presbyterian missionaries
American expatriates in India
1865 births
1912 deaths